Sir Edward Aurelian Ridsdale GBE (23 February 1864 – 6 September 1923) was a British Liberal politician and leading member of the British Red Cross Society.

Life
He was the eldest son of Edward Lucas Ridsdale of Rottingdean, Sussex  and the brother of Lucy Ridsdale, who married Stanley Baldwin.

Ridsdale was educated at University College School and the Royal School of Mines. He served as Member of Parliament for Brighton from 1906 to 1910, when he did not stand for re-election after disagreeing with government policy. He was chairman of the Executive Committee of the British Red Cross Society from 1912 and 1914 and deputy chairman from 1914 to 1919. In recognition of this work during the First World War he was knighted as Knight Grand Cross of the Order of the British Empire (GBE) in the 1920 civilian war honours.

He was a Fellow of the Geographical Society.

Family
Ridsdale married Susan Stirling, daughter of J. R. Findlater of Aberlour, Banffshire. His nephew, Sir Julian Ridsdale, was later the long-serving Conservative MP for Harwich.

References

Obituary, The Times, 8 September 1923

External links 
 

1864 births
1923 deaths
People educated at University College School
Alumni of Imperial College London
Liberal Party (UK) MPs for English constituencies
UK MPs 1906–1910
Knights Grand Cross of the Order of the British Empire